Drawing Down the Moon may refer to:

Drawing down the Moon (ritual), a Wiccan ritual
Drawing Down the Moon (Beherit album), 1993
Drawing Down the Moon (Azure Ray album), 2010
Drawing Down the Moon (film), a 1997 movie starring Walter Koenig
Drawing Down the Moon (book), a 1979 book by Margot Adler